Walter Michael van Nieuwenhuisen served as the eleventh Archbishop of Utrecht from 1768 to 1797.

Early ministry
Before serving as Archbishop of Utrecht, van Nieuwenhuisen served as a parish priest in Dordrecht.

Archbishop of Utrecht
Following the death of Petrus Johannes Meindaerts, Archbishop of Utrecht, on 31 October 1767, the Chapter of Utrecht unanimously elected van Nieuwenhuisen as bishop elect. On 7 February 1768 he was consecrated by Bishop Johannes van Stiphout of Haarlem and Bishop Bartholomaeus Johannes Byeveld of Deventer. Despite van Nieuwenhuisen’s excommunication by the Roman Catholic Church for this act, C.B. Moss says, “The new archbishop received letters of communion from [Roman Catholic] bishops in France, Germany, Italy, and Spain, and from a large number of [Roman Catholic] priests, who recognized fully, not only that the Church of Utrecht was orthodox in doctrine, but also that her claims to canonical jurisdiction were sound.”

Death
Van Nieuwenhuisen died on Good Friday, 14 April 1797.

References

Sources 

Year of birth missing
1797 deaths
18th-century archbishops
Dutch Old Catholic bishops
People from Utrecht (province)